Leonard Moore Hauss (July 11, 1942 – December 15, 2021) was an American professional football player who was a center in the National Football League (NFL) for the Washington Redskins from 1964 to 1977. A five-time Pro Bowl selection, he was named one of the 70 Greatest Redskins. Hauss played college football for the Georgia Bulldogs.

Early life
Hauss attended Jesup High School, where he played high school football as a fullback.  As a senior, he rushed for 1,500 yards and scored 15 touchdowns.

College career
Hauss attended and played college football at the University of Georgia, where he became a center.  He received All-Southeastern Conference honors as a sophomore.

Hauss was a member of the Sigma Chi fraternity.

Professional career
Hauss was drafted in the ninth round (115th overall) of the 1964 NFL Draft.  He started his first game at center four games into the 1964 season, a job he would not lose until retirement.  Hauss helped lead the Redskins to the Super Bowl VII in 1972.  He started 192 consecutive games for the Redskins between 1964 and 1977.  He was named to the Pro Bowl 5 times in 1966, 1968-1970, and 1972. In 1978, he was replaced by Bob Kuziel.

After football
After retiring from the NFL, Hauss entered the financial services industry.

Hauss died on December 15, 2021, at the age of 79.

References

1942 births
2021 deaths
Washington Redskins players
Eastern Conference Pro Bowl players
National Conference Pro Bowl players
Georgia Bulldogs football players
People from Jesup, Georgia
Players of American football from Georgia (U.S. state)
Presidents of the National Football League Players Association
Trade unionists from Georgia (U.S. state)